Ivo Daniel Ferreira Mendonça Pinto (born 7 January 1990) is a Portuguese professional footballer who plays for Dutch club Fortuna Sittard as a right-back.

Formed at Porto, he spent most of his career abroad, playing professionally in Romania, Croatia, England and the Netherlands. He won several domestic honours with Dinamo Zagreb.

Club career

Portugal
Born in Lourosa (Santa Maria da Feira), Pinto played youth football for three clubs, including six years with Boavista FC. In 2008, he joined neighbouring FC Porto, where he turned professional.

Pinto did not appear for Porto in the Primeira Liga, featuring as an unused substitute in two games. His only competitive appearance for the first team took place on 4 February 2009, when he came on as an 88th-minute substitute for Andrés Madrid in a 1–4 away loss against Sporting CP in the semi-finals of the Taça da Liga.

Pinto was consecutively loaned for the duration of his contract, to Gil Vicente FC, Vitória F.C. and S.C. Covilhã. He made his first top-division appearance with the second club, playing five minutes in a 0–2 defeat at precisely Porto on 13 December 2009.

In the summer of 2011, Pinto was bought by Rio Ave F.C. but never represented the team, being immediately loaned to U.D. Leiria also of the top tier. He started regularly for the side, but the season ended in relegation.

Cluj
Pinto spent the next few years in eastern Europe, first with CFR Cluj in Romania. His first competitive match took place on 14 July 2012, as he featured the full 120 minutes in a penalty shootout loss to FC Dinamo București for the Supercupa României (2–2 in regulation time). His debut in Liga I occurred seven days later, and he again started in a 1–1 home draw against CS Gaz Metan Mediaș.

Pinto made his debut in the UEFA Champions League on 1 August 2012, playing the entirety of the 1–0 win over FC Slovan Liberec. He appeared in every group stage game, with the team finishing third and moving to the UEFA Europa League.

Dinamo Zagreb
On 30 June 2013, Pinto signed a four-year deal with Croatian club GNK Dinamo Zagreb for a reported fee of €3 million. Upon his arrival, he stated he was aware of all the goals and ready to accept the challenge.

Pinto's maiden appearance in the Prva HNL occurred on 12 July 2013, in a 3–1 victory against NK Osijek where he replaced Jerko Leko at half-time. During his two-and-a-half-year tenure, he played 112 matches across all competitions and won the national championship three times.

Norwich City
Pinto joined English club Norwich City on 8 January 2016, for a reported fee of £2.2 million. He made his Premier League debut 15 days later, playing the full 90 minutes in a 4–5 home loss to Liverpool.

Pinto scored the first goal of his career on 24 September 2016, in a 3–1 win over Burton Albion also at Carrow Road. They returned to the English top flight at the end of the 2018–19 campaign, but he contributed only three appearances to this feat (five overall).

In May 2019, Pinto announced he would be leaving Norwich as a free agent on 30 June. During his spell, he took part in 94 official matches.

Return to Dinamo
Pinto returned to Dinamo Zagreb on 10 May 2019, signing a three-year contract. In the following transfer window, he was loaned to newly promoted F.C. Famalicão until the end of the Portuguese top-tier season.

On 29 August 2020, still owned by the Croatian club, Pinto returned to Rio Ave.

Fortuna Sittard
In August 2021, in a similar move, Pinto joined Fortuna Sittard in the Dutch Eredivisie. At the end of the campaign, a permanent transfer was arranged.

International career
Pinto earned 34 caps for Portugal at youth level, including six for the under-21s. He was named in Fernando Santos' first squad as manager of the full side in October 2014, ahead of a friendly with France and a UEFA Euro 2016 qualifying match against Denmark.

Style of play
Upon his arrival at Norwich City, manager Alex Neil described Pinto as a "good and athletic" defender. The player viewed himself as an intense and fast full-back, whilst his boss at Dinamo Zagreb Krunoslav Jurčić stated that he liked to attack in addition to being "solid defensively".

Career statistics

Honours
CFR Cluj
Cupa României runner-up: 2012–13

Dinamo Zagreb
Croatian First Football League: 2013–14, 2014–15, 2015–16
Croatian Football Cup: 2014–15

References

External links

1990 births
Living people
Sportspeople from Santa Maria da Feira
Portuguese footballers
Association football defenders
Primeira Liga players
Liga Portugal 2 players
FC Porto players
Gil Vicente F.C. players
Vitória F.C. players
S.C. Covilhã players
Rio Ave F.C. players
U.D. Leiria players
F.C. Famalicão players
Liga I players
CFR Cluj players
Croatian Football League players
GNK Dinamo Zagreb players
Premier League players
English Football League players
Norwich City F.C. players
Eredivisie players
Fortuna Sittard players
Portugal youth international footballers
Portugal under-21 international footballers
Portuguese expatriate footballers
Expatriate footballers in Romania
Expatriate footballers in Croatia
Expatriate footballers in England
Expatriate footballers in the Netherlands
Portuguese expatriate sportspeople in Romania
Portuguese expatriate sportspeople in Croatia
Portuguese expatriate sportspeople in England
Portuguese expatriate sportspeople in the Netherlands